QA or qa may refer to:

Geography
 Qatar, ISO 3166-1 alpha-2 country code QA

Airline codes
 Aerocaribe (IATA airline code QA)
 Cimber (airline) (IATA airline code QA)
 MexicanaClick (IATA airline code QA)

Businesses and organizations
 QA Ltd, UK based training company
 Qatar Academy, or QA, an International Baccalaureate school in Doha, Qatar
 Qantas Airlines, or QA, the national airline of Australia, traded on the American Stock Exchange as: QAN
 Queen Alexandra Hospital, the largest hospital serving the city of Portsmouth, UK

Science and technology
 QA (robot), a two-wheeled balancing telepresence robot developed by Anybots
 .qa, the country code top level domain (ccTLD) for Qatar
 ATCvet code QA Alimentary tract and metabolism, a section of the Anatomical Therapeutic Chemical Classification System for veterinary medicinal products
 "Qa-1", a form of alloantigen
 Qualitative analysis (disambiguation)
 Qualitative inorganic analysis, when shortened to qualitative analysis, can be abbreviated to QA
 Quality assurance, a process or set of processes used to measure and assure the quality of a product
 Quantitative analysis (disambiguation), the application of quantitative techniques in various areas of data analysis (e.g. finance)
 Quantitative analysis (chemistry), the measurements of quantities of substances produced in reactions rather than simply noting the nature of the reactions
 Question answering, a type of information retrieval

Other uses
 Qa (cuneiform), a sign in cuneiform writing
 Qa (Cyrillic), a character used in the Kurdish alphabet

See also 

 
 
 
 Q&A (disambiguation)
 QAS (disambiguation)
 AQ (disambiguation)
 A (disambiguation)
 Q (disambiguation)